Hustonville is a home rule-class city in Lincoln County, Kentucky, in the United States. The population was 405 at the 2010 census. It is part of the Danville Micropolitan Statistical Area.

History
The community was originally known as The Crossroads from its location on trails connecting the Kentucky and Green rivers and the Falls of the Ohio with Logan's Fort (present-day Stanford). It was then known as Farmington and, after the 1818 erection of a post office, Hanging Fork after a local stream named for two bandits who were hanged by Virginia officers rather than escorted back for trial. For three months in 1826, it was known as New Store, but the name then returned to Hanging Fork. When the town was established on February 29, 1836, it was renamed Hustonville after two local landowners; the post office adopted the name the next year. The city was formally incorporated by the state assembly in 1850.

During the mid 19th and early 20th centuries, Hustonville was home to Christian College.  The school was established following a fundraising campaign by William Logan Williams, who had been instrumental in securing money for church construction in the city.  Future U.S. senator and Governor of Kentucky, Augustus O. Stanley, served as chair of belles-lettres at the school in 1890.

Geography
The city is concentrated along Kentucky Route 78 (Main Street), just east of its intersection with U.S. Route 127, in northwestern Lincoln County. The city lies near the headwaters of Hanging Fork Creek, a tributary of the Dix River.

Demographics

As of the census of 2000, there were 347 people, 165 households, and 100 families residing in the city. The racial makeup of the city was 96.83% White, 1.15% African American, 0.29% Asian, and 1.73% from two or more races.

There were 165 households, out of which 21.8% had children under the age of 18 living with them, 45.5% were married couples living together, 11.5% had a female householder with no husband present, and 38.8% were non-families. 34.5% of all households were made up of individuals, and 19.4% had someone living alone who was 65 years of age or older. The average household size was 2.10 and the average family size was 2.67.

In the city, the population was spread out, with 17.3% under the age of 18, 6.1% from 18 to 24, 23.3% from 25 to 44, 28.2% from 45 to 64, and 25.1% who were 65 years of age or older. The median age was 46 years. For every 100 females, there were 81.7 males. For every 100 females age 18 and over, there were 85.2 males.

The median income for a household in the city was $33,750, and the median income for a family was $45,000. Males had a median income of $29,167 versus $22,917 for females. The per capita income for the city was $16,379. About 9.6% of families and 19.6% of the population were below the poverty line, including 12.2% of those under age 18 and 30.9% of those age 65 or over.

References

External links

City of Hustonville
Entry for Hustonville at the Kentucky Secretary of State website

Cities in Kentucky
Cities in Lincoln County, Kentucky
Danville, Kentucky micropolitan area